High adventure is a type of outdoor experience. It typically is meant to include activities like backpacking, hiking, kayaking or canoeing. It may also include mountaineering, rock climbing, mountain biking, orienteering, hang gliding, paragliding and hot air ballooning.

High adventure in Scouting
Scout leaders may offer traditional canoeing or backpacking high-adventure programs, but high adventure often transcends typical Scouting activities.  High adventure activities may include:

 All-terrain vehicles
 Aquatics Lifesaving
 Backpacking
 Camping
 Canoeing
 Caving
 Climbing / Rappelling
 Project COPE / Ropes Course
 Expedition Planning
 Extreme Sports
 Geocaching
 First Aid
 Fishing
 Historical reenactment/Living history
 Horsemanship
 Hunting
 Kayaking
 Leave No Trace
 Motorboating
 Mountain Biking
 Orienteering
 Personal Watercraft
 Sailing
 Search & Rescue
 Scuba Diving
 Shooting Sports/Archery
 Snorkeling
 Space Exploration
 Whitewater Rafting
 Wilderness Survival
 Winter Sports and Camping
 Zip-Line

See also

 Order of the Arrow High Adventure
 Outward Bound
 Outdoor education
 Powder Horn (Boy Scouts of America)
 Ten essential items of gear

Related activities:
Thru-hiking, hiking a trail from end to end
Hillwalking
List of long-distance footpaths
Hiking equipment
River trekking
Rogaining

References

External links

Outdoor recreation
Scoutcraft